Josef Rebell was a German/Austrian painter; born January 11, 1787, at Vienna. He was a pupil of Michael Wutky at the Vienna Academy. In 1809 he travelled through Switzerland and proceeded thence to Milan, where for two years he resided at the Court of Eugene Beauharnais. Later on he went to Rome, and from 1811 to 1815 he was at the Court of Murat at Naples. Was appointed Director of the Belvedere Gallery at Vienna. He painted Italian landscapes, three examples of his work being in the Vienna Museum. Others are in the Munich Pinakothek, the Berlin Gallery, and the Parma Gallery. He died at Dresden, December 18, 1828.

References
 

1787 births
1828 deaths
19th-century German painters
German male painters
19th-century Austrian painters
19th-century German male artists
Austrian male painters
Artists from Vienna